The Thomas A. Lemoine House, also known as Mayfield, is a historic house on Louisiana Highway 451 in Hamburg, Louisiana.

It is a one-and-a-half-story wood frame Italianate cottage built in 1885 by Thomas A. Lemoine. It has a five-bay Italianate-style front gallery.

One reason for its notability is its interior which includes a painted ceiling, which is a generally rare feature in Louisiana, although there were in fact three other houses with them in the parish surviving in 1985.  The ceiling was said by tradition to have been painted by an Ursuline nun.

The house was listed on the National Register of Historic Places in 1985.

References

See also
Thomas A. Lemoine House (Moreauville, Louisiana), another house built in Moreauville by same builder.  It was built in 1916 in Arts and Crafts style.
National Register of Historic Places listings in Avoyelles Parish, Louisiana

Houses on the National Register of Historic Places in Louisiana
Italianate architecture in Louisiana
Houses completed in 1885
Avoyelles Parish, Louisiana